Mammillaria grusonii is a cactus in the genus Mammillaria of the family Cactaceae. The epithet grusonii honors the inventor, scientist, industrialist and cacti collector Hermann Gruson of Magdeburg.

Description
Mammillaria grusonii usually grows singly. The tubercles are four-angled and contain latex. The axillae are initially woolly, later naked. The spines are straight, reddish and becomes white with age. The two central spines are 0.4 to 0.6 centimeters long, while the 12 to 14 radial spines are 0.6 to 0.8 centimeters long. The pale yellow, bell-shaped flowers are up to 2.5 centimeters long and have an equal diameter. The fruits are bright scarlet and contain brown seeds.

Distribution

References
 
 Mammillarias.net
 Distribution Map
 Cacti Guide
 Desert-tropical

grusonii
Cacti of Mexico